powercfg (executable name powercfg.exe) is a command-line utility that is used from an elevated Windows Command Prompt to control all configurable power system settings, including hardware-specific configurations that are not configurable through the Control Panel, on a per-user basis.  It was first introduced by Microsoft in Windows XP SP2 in 2004.

Usage
powercfg must be run from an elevated command prompt, and, under Windows XP, it requires workstation Administrator or power user rights.  Power Schemes are configured on a per-user basis.  The most common cause of problems with power saving and hibernation on Windows systems is an incompatible device driver.  This can be diagnosed by disabling each device in turn (with powercfg /devicedisablewake).  When activating power saving across a local area network, it is important to ensure that software updates, security patches and antivirus updates in particular, are not disrupted.  Microsoft recommends that its Windows Server Update Services be configured to install updates when workstations are available and Windows Task Scheduler can be set to wake the machine when needed.

Syntax
XP
POWERCFG [/LIST | /QUERY [name] | /CREATE name | /DELETE name | /SETACTIVE name | /CHANGE name settings | /HIBERNATE {ON|OFF} | /NUMERICAL int | /EXPORT name [/FILE filename] | /IMPORT name [/FILE filename] | /GLOBALPOWERFLAG {ON|OFF} /OPTION flag | /BATTERYALARM {LOW|CRITICAL} [settings] | /DEVICEQUERY flagquery | /DEVICEENABLEWAKE devicename | /DEVICEDISABLEWAKE devicename | /?]
Vista,  7
powercfg [/l[ist]] [/q[uery] [Scheme_GUID] [Sub_GUID]] ] [/x setting value] [/changename GUID name [scheme_description]] [/duplicatescheme GUID [DestinationGUID]] [/d[elete] GUID] [/deletesetting Sub_GUID Setting_GUID] [/s[etactive] Scheme_GUID] [/getactivescheme] [/setacvalueindex Scheme_GUID Sub_GUID Setting_GUID SettingIndex] [/setdcvalueindex Scheme_GUID Sub_GUID Setting_GUID SettingIndex] [/h[ibernate] [on|off]] [/a[vailablesleepstates]] [/devicequery query_flags] [/deviceenablewake devicename] [/devicedisablewake devicename] [/import filename [GUID]] [/export filename [GUID]] [/lastwake] [/aliases] [/setsecuritydescriptor [GUID|Action] SDDL] [/getsecuritydescriptor [GUID|Action]] [/requests] [/requestsoverride Caller_type Name Request] [/energy [/output filename] [/xml] [/duration seconds] [/trace [/d filepath]] [/waketimers] [/?]

Parameters
{| class="wikitable sortable"
|-
! rowspan=2 | Parameter
! rowspan=2 | Description
! colspan=2 | OS
|-
! XP
! Other
|-
|style="vertical-align:top"|/l[ist]
|style="vertical-align:top"|Lists all power schemes in the current user's environment.
|style="background:#90ff90;color:black;vertical-align:middle;text-align:center" class="table-yes"|
|style="background:#90ff90;color:black;vertical-align:middle;text-align:center" class="table-yes"|
|-
|style="vertical-align:top"|/q[uery] [scheme_name] (XP)/q[uery] [Scheme_GUID] [Sub_GUID]
|style="vertical-align:top"|Displays the contents of the specified power scheme. 

|style="background:#90ff90;color:black;vertical-align:middle;text-align:center" class="table-yes"|
|style="background:#90ff90;color:black;vertical-align:middle;text-align:center" class="table-yes"|
|-
|style="vertical-align:top"|
|style="vertical-align:top"|Creates a power scheme with the specified scheme_name.
|style="background:#90ff90;color:black;vertical-align:middle;text-align:center" class="table-yes"|
|style="background:#ff9090;color:black;vertical-align:middle;text-align:center" class="table-no"|
|-
|style="vertical-align:top"|/change setting value/x setting value
|style="vertical-align:top"|Modifies a setting value in the current power scheme. 

|style="background:#90ff90;color:black;vertical-align:middle;text-align:center" class="table-yes"|
|style="background:#90ff90;color:black;vertical-align:middle;text-align:center" class="table-yes"|
|-
|style="vertical-align:top"|/changename GUID PowerSchemeName [scheme_description]
|style="vertical-align:top"|Modifies the name of a power scheme and, optionally, the scheme description.

|style="background:#ff9090;color:black;vertical-align:middle;text-align:center" class="table-no"|
|style="background:#90ff90;color:black;vertical-align:middle;text-align:center" class="table-yes"|
|-
|style="vertical-align:top"|/duplicatescheme GUID [DestinationGUID]
|style="vertical-align:top"|Duplicates the specified power scheme. The resulting GUID which represents the new scheme will be displayed.

|style="background:#ff9090;color:black;vertical-align:middle;text-align:center" class="table-no"|
|style="background:#90ff90;color:black;vertical-align:middle;text-align:center" class="table-yes"|
|-
|style="vertical-align:top"|/d[elete] scheme_name /d[elete] GUID
|style="vertical-align:top"|Deletes the power scheme with the specified GUID. 

|style="background:#90ff90;color:black;vertical-align:middle;text-align:center" class="table-yes"|
|style="background:#90ff90;color:black;vertical-align:middle;text-align:center" class="table-yes"|
|-
|style="vertical-align:top"|/deletesetting Sub_GUID Setting_GUID
|style="vertical-align:top"|Deletes a power setting.

|style="background:#ff9090;color:black;vertical-align:middle;text-align:center" class="table-no"|
|style="background:#90ff90;color:black;vertical-align:middle;text-align:center" class="table-yes"|
|-
|style="vertical-align:top"|/s[etactive] scheme_name-s[etactive] Scheme_GUID
|style="vertical-align:top"|Makes the specified power scheme active on the computer. 

|style="background:#90ff90;color:black;vertical-align:middle;text-align:center" class="table-yes"|
|style="background:#90ff90;color:black;vertical-align:middle;text-align:center" class="table-yes"|
|-
|style="vertical-align:top"|/getactivescheme
|style="vertical-align:top"|Retrieves the currently active power scheme.
|style="background:#ff9090;color:black;vertical-align:middle;text-align:center" class="table-no"|
|style="background:#90ff90;color:black;vertical-align:middle;text-align:center" class="table-yes"|
|-
|style="vertical-align:top"|/setacvalueindex Scheme_GUID Sub_GUID Setting_GUID SettingIndex
|style="vertical-align:top"|Sets a value associated with a specified power setting while the computer is powered by AC power.

Power scheme GUIDs
The use of GUIDs avoids any problems with internationalisation when applying Power Saving to non-English versions of Windows. The three built-in power schemes have the aliases listed below, which can be used instead of the GUIDs: 
SCHEME_MAX = Power saver (Max power saving)
SCHEME_BALANCED = Balanced (Typical)
SCHEME_MIN = High performance (Min power saving)

The other GUIDs have aliases as well.

Examples
Lists all power schemes powercfg /l
List all Aliases powercfg -aliases
Retrieve the currently active power schemepowercfg -getactivescheme
Set the Monitor and disc timeouts for the current Power saver scheme powercfg -Change -monitor-timeout-ac 20
powercfg -Change -disk-timeout-ac 30
Enable the mouse to wake from sleep powercfg -deviceEnableWake "Microsoft USB IntelliMouse Explorer"
Set the 'Power saver' scheme powercfg -SETACTIVE SCHEME_MAX
Create a Custom Power scheme and set it as active Set _Custom_Power=B1234567-SS64-SS64-SS64-F00000111AAA
powercfg -DUPLICATESCHEME SCHEME_MAX %_Custom_Power%
powercfg -CHANGENAME %_Custom_Power% "SS64 Power Scheme "
powercfg -SETACTIVE %_Custom_Power%
Disable the sleep button (for the users current power scheme) For /f "tokens=2 delims=:(" %%G in ('powercfg -getActiveScheme') do (
  powercfg -setAcValueIndex %%G sub_buttons sButtonAction 0
  powercfg -setActive %%G
)
Disable the sleep button (for all available power schemes) For /f "skip=2 tokens=2,4 delims=:()" %%G in ('powercfg -list') do (
  powercfg -setAcValueIndex %%G sub_buttons sButtonAction 0
  if "%%H" == " *" powercfg -setActive %%G
)

See also
List of Control Panel applets (Windows)#Standard applets

References

Further reading

External links